The Werewolf of Ponkert is a collection of two horror short stories by H. Warner Munn.  It was published in book form with its sequel in 1958 by The Grandon Company in an edition of 500 copies.  The edition was reissued as a hardback book by Centaur Books of New York in 1971, and as a paperback edition in 1976.

The first story, "The Werewolf of Ponkert" arose from a comment by H.P. Lovecraft suggesting a story written from the werewolf's point of view.

The stories, from Munn's Tales of the Werewolf Clan series (collected in book form, 2 vols., 1979), first appeared in the magazine Weird Tales. The first story was originally published in Weird Tales magazine, Vol. 6, No. 1, Issue 22, July 1925.  The sequel, "The Werewolf's Daughter" (in abridged form) was published in Weird Tales, Vol. 12, No. 4, No. 5 & No. 6 (Issues 61, 62 & 63) in October 1928, November 1928 & December 1928.

Contents
 "The Werewolf of Ponkert"
 "The Werewolf's Daughter"

References

Sources

1958 short story collections
Horror short story collections
Werewolf written fiction
Works originally published in Weird Tales